Ectaga garcia is a moth in the family Depressariidae. It was described by Vitor O. Becker in 1994. It is found in Minas Gerais, Brazil. The species was introduced to northern New South Wales to control Lantana camara. However, the species has failed to establish itself in Australia.

The larvae feed on Lantana camara, Lantana griesebachiana and Lantana montevidensis.

References

Moths described in 1994
Ectaga